Tracy Yardley (born July 19, 1979, in Southern Illinois) is an American comic book artist best known for his work with the Sonic the Hedgehog comics, originally published by Archie Comics.

Career

Sonic the Hedgehog comics 
Yardley has been greatly interested in comics for most of his life, as well as the Sonic the Hedgehog video game series. He grew up reading the earliest issues of Archie Comics' officially licensed Sonic the Hedgehog comic book series. He professionally spells his name with an "!" at the end as a tribute to Scott Shaw, who also spelled his name the same way. Scott Shaw was one of the first artists whom worked on Archie Comics' Sonic the Hedgehog series.

Yardley worked mainly as a penciller on Archie Comics' Sonic the Hedgehog series from 2005 until Sega of America's termination of Archie Comics' license in 2017. Yardley also occasionally worked on the spin-off comic Sonic X, and served as the main artist for the side-series Sonic Universe. After IDW Publishing picked up the Sonic the Hedgehog license, the company confirmed Yardley as one of the pencillers for their own Sonic the Hedgehog comic book series, which started circulation in April 2018.

He and Ian Flynn collaborated closely on the Sonic the Hedgehog series during the Archie Comics years, sometimes himself writing script for the series. He has even inked and occasionally colored a few issues. The collaboration will continue for IDW Publishing's series.

Other works 
Although Sega canceled their Sonic the Hedgehog comic series, Archie Comics brought back Yardley, alongside colleagues Ian Flynn and Matt Herms, to revive their Cosmo the Merry Martian intellectual property. The first issue of Cosmo the Mighty Martian was released in January 2018.

Yardley worked as the main penciler/inker of an original manga-like series known as Riding Shotgun, published by Tokyopop. Riding Shotgun ended after two volumes, though Yardley still had ideas for a third volume.

One of Yardley's first known, original comics was a series known as Nate and Steve, on which he worked with three of his friends.

References

External links 

 Tracy Yardley!'s DeviantArt Page

1979 births
American comics artists
Living people
Sonic the Hedgehog
Savannah College of Art and Design alumni
Tokyopop
People from Effingham County, Georgia